The 2017 European Junior Championship was the 13th European Junior Championship. It was held from July 14 to July 16, 2017 in Paris.

Qualification 
A total of eight teams reported to enter for qualification. Therefore, two four-nation tournaments were scheduled, with the winners of these tournaments earning a spot for the final tournament in Paris. Germany, the Netherlands, Spain, and Switzerland were grouped together while the other tournament was planned with Serbia, Italy, Russia and Hungary. As a consequence of the conflict of two organisations, both claiming to be the real IFAF, some weeks before the start of the qualification, a second European Junior Championship was announced to be held in Denmark. Russia and Hungary thus withdrew their participation in the Serbian qualification tournament.

Tournament in Serbia 
Russia and Hungary withdrew. Italy qualified by a victory over host Serbia.

Tournament in the Netherlands 
All matches were played in Almere. Germany won both games with a shutout and thus qualified for the final tournament in Paris.

Final tournament

Qualified teams 
 (host nation)
 (defending champion)
 (tournament in Serbia)
 (tournament in Netherlands)

Bracket

Matches

References 

European Junior Championship
2017
International sports competitions hosted by Paris